Mónika Lamperth (born 5 September 1957 in Bácsbokod) is a Hungarian politician and jurist, who served as Interior Minister between 2002 and 2006, after that she became Minister of Local Government until 2007, while Ferenc Gyurcsány appointed her as Minister of Social Affairs and Labour.

Personal life
She is married to Dr András Jegesy. They have a daughter, Vera and a son, András.

References

External links
 Official website of Mónika Lamperth
 Mónika Lamperth on the Hungarian government's site
 Mónika Lamperth's profile on the Hungarian parliament's page
 Biography on the MSZP's site

1957 births
Living people
People from Bács-Kiskun County
Hungarian Socialist Party politicians
Members of the Hungarian Socialist Workers' Party
Members of the National Assembly of Hungary (1994–1998)
Members of the National Assembly of Hungary (1998–2002)
Members of the National Assembly of Hungary (2002–2006)
Members of the National Assembly of Hungary (2006–2010)
Members of the National Assembly of Hungary (2010–2014)
Hungarian Interior Ministers
Government ministers of Hungary
Women members of the National Assembly of Hungary
Women government ministers of Hungary
20th-century Hungarian women politicians
21st-century Hungarian women politicians
Female interior ministers